Halkan (also Romanized as Halḵān) is a village in Koregah-e Gharbi Rural District, in the Central District of Khorramabad County, Lorestan Province, Iran. At the 2006 census, its population was 34, in 7 families.

References 

Towns and villages in Khorramabad County